Hans Leonhard Schäufelein (c. 1480–1540) was a German artist, as a painter and designer of woodcuts.

Biography
He was born in Nuremberg, probably studied under Wohlgemut, and then became the assistant of Dürer, whom he imitated.  In 1512 he went to Augsburg and in 1515 removed to Nordlingen.

He is a graceful narrator, and his types, though rarely accurately drawn, are attractive, but he lacks power and depth.  Characteristic early paintings are the altarpiece at Ober Sankt Veit near Vienna (1502), "Scenes from the Life of Christ" (Dresden Gallery), and "St. Jerome" (Germanisches Nationalmuseum, Nuremberg).

To his Nordlingen period belong his masterpiece, the so-called "Ziegler Altar" for St. George's Church (1521), part of which is still in the church, part in the museum; "Scenes from the Story of Judith," in the town hall; and the illuminated Psalter for Count von Ottingen, now in the Berlin print room.  His most important woodcuts are those for the Theuerdank of Emperor Maximilian.

Schäufelein created a playing card deck about 1535, which is regarded as a highlight in German 16th century playing card production.

References

16th-century German painters
German male painters
1480s births
1540 deaths
Artists from Nuremberg